Thomas Buttolph  was an Anglican priest in Ireland.

He was educated at Corpus Christi College, Cambridge. Buttolph was ordained priest on 1 December 1623. He was Dean of Raphoe from 1671 until his death five years later. There is a monument to him in St Patrick's Cathedral, Dublin.

References

17th-century Irish Anglican priests
People from Norfolk
1676 deaths
Alumni of Corpus Christi College, Cambridge
Deans of Raphoe
Year of birth missing